Malo Soula (Serbian: A Little Bit of Soul) is a 1996 album by Serbian pop duo K2. It was released in spring 1996.

The album contains 10 songs. The producers of all the songs off album were sisters Kovač themselves, with Kristina being the main and Aleksandra, a co-producer. The main single was "Dabadamdam", was released in December 1995. In total, three songs were released off the album, and videos were shot for all of the singles.

Track list 
 "Malo Soula" — 3:41
 "Zašto?" — 4:02
 "Sestre" — 3:10
 "Rano je" — 3:56
 "Luda" — 3:38
 "Dabadamdam" — 3:27
 "Dal' i tebi?" — 3:58
 "Biću tvoja devojka" — 3:15
 "Svrha ljubavi" — 4:18
 "Your Woman" — 4:23

References

External links 
 On: www.discogs.com

1996 albums